An annular solar eclipse will occur on March 10, 2100. A solar eclipse occurs when the Moon passes between Earth and the Sun, thereby totally or partly obscuring the image of the Sun for a viewer on Earth. An annular solar eclipse occurs when the Moon's apparent diameter is smaller than the Sun's, blocking most of the Sun's light and causing the Sun to look like an annulus (ring). An annular eclipse appears as a partial eclipse over a region of the Earth thousands of kilometers wide.
The path of annularity will move from Indonesia at sunrise, over the islands of Hawaii and Maui around noon, and through the northwestern United States at sunset.

The eclipse will be visible over Indonesia and Pacific Ocean west of the International Date Line, on the morning of Thursday, March 11, 2100, and the Pacific Ocean east of International Date Line and North America on the afternoon of Wednesday, March 10, 2100. The path of annularity will be visible in those locations.

Related eclipses

Solar eclipses 2098–2100

Inex series

References

External links 

2100 3 10
2100 3 10
2100 3 10